Moedomo Soedigdomarto, also spelled Mudomo Sudigdomarto, (29 November 1927, Magetan – 5 November 2005, Bandung) was an Indonesian mathematician, educator and professor at the Bandung Institute of Technology, of which he was rektor.

Soedigdomarto was one of the first Indonesians to obtain a Ph.D. in mathematics, which he earned from the University of Illinois, with a dissertation entitled "A Representation Theory for the Laplace Transform of Vector-Valued Functions", in 1959 at the age of 32, under the orientation of Robert Gardner Bartle.

Soedigdomarto was the first Indonesian to have a paper recorded in Mathematical Reviews (Moedomo and J. J. Uhl, Jr. "Radon-Nikodym theorems for the Bochner and Pettis integrals" published in the Pacific Journal of Mathematics in 1971).

References

1927 births
2005 deaths
Indonesian mathematicians
University of Illinois alumni
Academic staff of Bandung Institute of Technology
Mathematical analysts